It Begins Again is the tenth studio album recorded by Dusty Springfield and the ninth released. Recorded during the middle of 1977, It Begins Again was her first completed and released album since Cameo five years earlier. Two of the album's titles, "Turn Me Around" and "A Love Like Yours (Don't Come Knocking Every Day)", were tracks from the abandoned 1974 Longing sessions and Springfield decided to record new versions of both songs for It Begins Again, placing Chi Coltrane's "Turn Me Around" as the opening track.

Background 
It Begins Again, which was Springfield's debut album for the United Artists label in the US and Mercury Records in the UK, was recorded in Los Angeles and produced by Englishman Roy Thomas Baker, at the time best known for helping create the four first albums by Queen. Musically It Begins Again was however geared towards the American adult contemporary, pop and disco markets. Contributing on the album were some of the most renowned American session musicians of the era, such as Jay Graydon, Jeff Baxter, Joe Sample, Ed Greene and David Paich and it featured backing vocals by Pattie Brooks, Dianne Brooks and Brenda Russell – all acclaimed recording artists and composers in their own right. The songs on the album were also written by a number of notable composers and lyricists, among others Nona Hendryx, Lesley Gore, Ellen Weston, Dean Parks, Peter Allen and Carole Bayer Sager. Barry Manilow's "Sandra", often singled out as the highlight of the set, is a gentle piano ballad that portrays the life of a suburban housewife who minutely details her daily chores, all the while assuring both herself and the listener that "I swear I love my husband and I swear I love my kids" – yet in the last verse she reveals that she one day found herself cutting her wrists "doing the dishes, quite by mistake. It was real touch and go for a while."

Containing a diverse range of styles, It Begins Again was seen as somewhat experimental by Springfield herself, as well as music critics, who generally gave it favourable reviews. Despite the critical reception, the hopeful album title, as well as a series of promotional performances made in both the US and the UK promoting the up-tempo singles "A Love Like Yours" and "That's the Kind of Love I've Got for You", It Begins Again only briefly made the charts in Britain, peaking at No. 41, and did not chart in the US. Springfield stated that she had wanted to try something different, but felt that she now needed to move into a different style, a commercial, lightweight R&B, which resulted in the following album Living Without Your Love.

In 2002, Mercury/Universal Music UK released the album on CD for the first time, then also including Tom Moulton's extended remix of "That's the Kind of Love I've Got for You", originally only released as a promotional 12" single, which took advantage of the popularity of disco at the time. The song which was the closing track on It Begins Again was, however, the only true disco song on the album. The 12" version was somewhat popular with US deejays and the track in fact managed to reach No. 31 in the US Hot Dance Club Play chart.

When Pet Shop Boys in 2005 released their instalment in the mix album series Back to Mine they both included a Dusty Springfield track, Neil Tennant chose her 60s classic "Goin' Back" – and Chris Lowe rather surprisingly the ballad "I'd Rather Leave While I'm in Love" from It Begins Again.

Track listing

Side A
"Turn Me Around"  (Chi Coltrane) – 3:28
"Checkmate" (Nona Hendryx) 3:23
"I'd Rather Leave While I'm in Love"  (Peter Allen, Carole Bayer Sager) – 2:53
"A Love Like Yours (Don't Come Knocking Every Day)"  (Lamont Dozier, Edward Holland Jr., Brian Holland) – 3:16
"Love Me by Name" (Lesley Gore, Ellen Weston) – 4:16

Side B
"Sandra"  (Enoch Anderson, Barry Manilow) – 4:37
"I Found Love with You"  (Bob Esty, Michelle Aller) – 3:18
"Hollywood Movie Girls" (Gaille Heideman) 3:40
"That's the Kind of Love I've Got for You" (Dean Parks, Donald Fletcher) – 5:00

Bonus track 2002 CD reissue
"That's the Kind of Love I've Got for You" (Tom Moulton Extended Mix) (Fletcher, Parks) – 7:10
 First release: promotional 12" single, United Artists SP 178. First commercial release: 4 CD boxed set Simply Dusty, 2000

Personnel and production
 Dusty Springfield – lead vocals, background vocals, production associate
 Barry Fosman – musical arranger
 Peter Matz – arranger
 Bob Esty – arranger
 Trevor Veitch – arranger
 Reginald Sonny Burke - arranger on "That's the Kind of Love I've Got for You"
 Michele Aller – background vocals
 Dianne Brooks – background vocals
 Patti Brooks – background vocals
 Brenda Russell – background vocals
 Tommy Vig – background vocals, vibraphone
 Rick Shlosser – drums
 Ed Greene – drums
 Oscar Castro-Neves – percussion
 Mr. M. – percussion
 Jeff Baxter – guitar
 Charles Fearing – guitar
 Jay Graydon – guitar
 Thom Rotella – guitar
 David T. Walker – guitar
 Keni Burke – bass guitar
 Colin Cameron – bass guitar
 Bob Glaub – bass guitar
 Chuck Rainey – bass guitar
 Joe Sample – piano, keyboards
 David Paich – piano, keyboards
 William D. "Smitty" Smith – piano, keyboards, arranger
 Jai Winding – piano, keyboards
 John Barnes – synthesizer, keyboards, electric piano, Clavinet
 Bill Payne – synthesizer, piano, electric piano, Clavinet
 Richard Tee – piano, keyboards
 Jerry Jumonville – saxophone, horn arrangements
 Sid Sharp – concert master
Technical
 Roy Thomas Baker – record producer
 Tom Moulton – remix ("That's The Kind of Love I've Got for You" Extended Mix)
 David Hines – sound engineer
 Joe Robb – engineer
 Bill Burks – art direction
 Jeanette Post – album co-ordination
 Norma Goldstein – album co-ordination
 Barry Krost – management
 Trevor Veitch – musical contractor
 Michael Childers – photography
 Recorded and Mixed at Cherokee Recording Studios, L.A.
 Mastered at Sterling Sound, N.Y.
 Produced for R.T.B. (Audio Visual) Prod. Ltd.

Sources

 Howes, Paul (2001). The Complete Dusty Springfield. London: Reynolds & Hearn Ltd. .

1978 albums
Dusty Springfield albums
Albums arranged by Peter Matz
Albums produced by Roy Thomas Baker
Mercury Records albums
United Artists Records albums